The men's pole vault event  at the 1978 European Athletics Indoor Championships was held on 11 March in Milan.

Results

References

Pole vault at the European Athletics Indoor Championships
Pole